Back to Tulsa – Live and Loud at Cain's Ballroom is a live CD/DVD combo, released on October 31, 2006, by Cross Canadian Ragweed.  The CD and DVD were recorded July 14 and 15, 2006, at the historic Cain's Ballroom and Dancehall in Tulsa, Oklahoma, in front of sold-out crowds. Produced by Rob Dennis & Cross Canadian Ragweed. This is the band's eighth album.

Double Live CD
Disc 1

"Dimebag" (Canada/Mike McClure)
"Number" (Canada/Stoney LaRue/Edmondson)
"Lonely Girl" (Canada)
"Late Last Night" (Todd Snider)
"Final Curtain" (Canada)
"Sister" (Canada/LaRue)
"Constantly" (Canada)
"Don't Need You" (Canada)
"Fightin' For" (Canada/McClure)
"When it All Goes Down" (Canada/Bowen) {duet with Wade Bowen}
"Anywhere But Here" (Canada/Plato)
"Daddy's at Home" (Ragsdale)
"The Needle and the Damage Done" (Neil Young)
"When Will It End" (Canada/LaRue) {duet with Stoney LaRue}
"Back Around" (Canada/Roberson)
"Brooklyn Kid" (Canada)

Disc 2

"Cold Hearted Woman" (Canada/McClure)
"Jimmy and Annie" (Canada/LaRue)
"Wanna Rock & Roll" (Hubbard)
"17" (Canada/Boland)
"Hammer Down" (Canada)
"Alabama" (Canada/Roberson)
"Blues for You" (Canada/LaRue)
"Lonely Feeling" (Robert Earl Keen)
Hidden Track "Take Me Back to Tulsa" (A cover of a Bob Wills song, who frequently played at the Cain's Ballroom)

DVD
"Late Last Night"
"Fightin' For"
"Don't Need You"
"Number"
"Dimebag"
"Final Curtain"
"Lonely Girl"
"Constantly"
"Sister"
"Anywhere But Here"
"Back Around"
"Cold Hearted Woman"
"Blues For You"
"Alabama"
"Hammer Down"
"Wanna Rock And Roll"

Personnel
Cody Canada - lead vocals, lead guitar, harmonica
Jeremy Plato - bass guitar, background vocals
Grady Cross - rhythm guitar
Randy Ragsdale - drums, lead vocal & guitar on "Daddy's at Home"

Chart performance

References

Cross Canadian Ragweed albums
2006 live albums
2006 video albums
Live video albums
Show Dog-Universal Music live albums
Show Dog-Universal Music video albums